Sejong High School (Miryang), South Gyeongsang Province
 Sejong High School (Sejong)
 Sejong High School (Yeoju), Gyeonggi Province
 Seoul Sejong High School
 Sejong Science High School, Seoul